Chancellor House or Chancellor's Residence or similar may refer to:
in Ireland
The Chancellor's House, medieval stone building in County Kerry

in South Africa
Chancellor House, a South African holding company managing investments for the African National Congress;
Chancellor House, a historic building in Johannesburg, South Africa

in the United States
Chancellor House (Harpersfield, Alabama), listed on the National Register of Historic Places in Alabama
Chancellor's Residence (University of Pittsburgh)